Chapel Hill is a historic home located near Lexington, Rockbridge County, Virginia. It was built about 1842, and is a two-story, Federal style brick dwelling. It has a lower two-story rear wing with a brick first story and weatherboard-sided second story add about 1910.  It features a molded cyma recta brick cornices below a metal sheathed side-gable roof.  It has highly unusual vernacular mantels and a stone chimney from a former outbuilding.

It was listed on the National Register of Historic Places in 2011.

References

Houses on the National Register of Historic Places in Virginia
Houses completed in 1842
Federal architecture in Virginia
Houses in Rockbridge County, Virginia
National Register of Historic Places in Rockbridge County, Virginia